Lohara  is a village in Dondiluhara tehsil, Balod district, Chhattisgarh, India.

Demographics
In the 2001 India census, the village of Lohara in Balod district had a population of 5,263, with 2,612 males (49.6%) and 2,651 females (50.4%), for a gender ratio of 1015 females per thousand males.

References

Villages in Durg district